Parliamentary elections were held in Chad on 5 January 1997, with a second round on 23 February. They were the first multi-party elections since independence in 1960 and resulted in a victory for the ruling Patriotic Salvation Movement (MPS), which won 65 of the 124 seats in the National Assembly. However,  the elections were marred by electoral fraud widespread vote rigging, and local irregularities marred these elections, as the 1996 presidential elections. Voter turnout was 45.6% in the first round and 45.3% in the second.

Electoral system
The elections were held using the two round system. Candidates had to win a majority of the vote in the first round to be elected. In constituencies where no candidate received a majority, a second round was held.

Campaign
A total of 30 parties contested the elections, putting forward 656 candidates.

Results

Aftermath
The newly elected National Assembly was opened on 4 April. A government was formed with Nassour Guelendouksia Ouaido as Prime Minister on 21 May.

References

Elections in Chad
Parliamentary election
Chad
Chadian parliamentary election
Chadian parliamentary election